Minuscule 576 (in the Gregory-Aland numbering), ε 1318 (in the Soden numbering), is a Greek minuscule manuscript of the New Testament, on parchment. Palaeographically it has been assigned to the 11th century. 
The manuscript is lacunose.

Description 

The codex contains only the text of the Gospel of Matthew (22:4-19) on 1 parchment leaves (size ). The text is written in one column per page, in 26 lines per page.

There is also a division according to the smaller Ammonian Sections (no references to the Eusebian Canons).

Text 

The Greek text of the codex is mixed with a predominate element of the Byzantine text-type. The Greek text of the codex was not placed by Aland in any Category.

According to Hermann von Soden its text is close to the textual families Πa and Πb.

History 

The manuscript was added to the list of New Testament manuscripts by Gregory.

The manuscript belonged to the same codex as manuscript 435, housed at the Leiden University Library (Gronov. 137) in Leiden, but it was classified as minuscule 576 (Gregory-Aland) before identification with the codex 435.

Currently it is housed at the Arundel Castle and belongs to the Duke of Norfolk (M.D. 459).

See also 

 List of New Testament minuscules
 Biblical manuscript
 Textual criticism

References

Further reading 

 

Greek New Testament minuscules
11th-century biblical manuscripts